Happy Hours is an Indian Hindi comedy television series, which is broadcast on &TV. The series is produced by Essel Vision Productions and Diamond Pictures.

Plot
The show will showcase talented artist donning different avatar and entertaining audience with their gags. There is no definite plot as the show takes a topic(which is usually circled around social media) and presents a series of acts each day but always consists of social media jokes, funny videos sent to Happy Hours, The Social Baba Act and audience interaction along with one or more acts including The Rangana Kanaut Show, Useless Argument(Debate) and Court Cases.

Cast 
 Abhay Singh as Abhay Pratap Singh
 Jaswant Singh as Social Baba
 Aarti Kandpal as Sasu Maa and various characters
 Paritosh Tripathi as Anchor and in various characters
 Amit Khanna as Various Characters
 Monica Murthy and Abhimanyu Kak as Anchors
 Pooja Misrra / Sangeeta Khanayat as Miss Trendy

References

2016 Indian television series debuts
2017 Indian television series endings
Hindi-language television shows
Indian comedy television series
&TV original programming
Indian television sketch shows